Yasutomo is a masculine Japanese given name.

Possible writings
Yasutomo can be written using many different combinations of kanji characters. Here are some examples:

靖友, "peaceful, friend"
靖朝, "peaceful,morning/dynasty"
靖智, "peaceful, intellect"
靖朋, "peaceful, companion"
靖知, "peaceful,intellect"
康友, "healthy, friend"
康朝, "healthy, morning/dynasty"
康智, "healthy, intellect"
康朋, "healthy, companion"
康知, "healthy, intellect"
安友, "tranquil, friend"
安朝, "tranquil, morning/dynasty"
保友, "preserve, friend"
保朝, "preserve, morning/dynasty"
保智, "preserve, intellect"
泰友, "peaceful, friend"
泰朝, "peaceful, morning/dynasty"
易朝, "divination, morning/dynasty"

The name can also be written in hiragana やすとも or katakana ヤストモ.

Notable people with the name
, Japanese baseball player
, Japanese motorcycle racer
, Japanese politician

Fictional characters
Yasutomo Arakita (荒北 靖友), from manga series Yowamushi Pedal

Japanese masculine given names